Eric Haseltine is chairman of the Board of the US Technology Leadership Council (USTLC). He is a technologist who has worked in senior-executive positions in both industry and the United States intelligence community. Haseltine also is CEO of the startup Discovery Democracy LLC that manufactures industrial safety sensors.

Academics
Haseltine received a Bachelor of Arts degree in economics and psychology from the University of California, Berkeley, and a PhD in physiological psychology from Indiana University. He also has a certificate in Executive Management from UCLA's Anderson School of Management. He accomplished post-doctoral work in brain research at Vanderbilt University School of Medicine.

Career
Haseltine spent 13 years at Hughes Aircraft, where he rose to the position of Director of Engineering. He then left for Walt Disney Imagineering in 1992, where he joined the research and development group, working on large-scale virtual-reality projects. In 1998, he was promoted to senior vice president responsible for all technology projects. In 2000, he was made Executive Vice President. Haseltine was head of research and development for Walt Disney Imagineering by the time he left in 2002 to join the National Security Agency as Director of Research. From 2005 to 2007, Haseltine was associate director for Science and Technology, Office of the Director of National Intelligence (ODNI)—that organization's first—a position he described in a 2006 U.S. News & World Report interview by stating: "You can think of me as the CTO [chief technology officer] of the intelligence community".

Haseltine currently specializes in cyber security, personal protection and privacy. He frequently collaborates with his wife, Chris Gilbert MD PHD, writing, speaking and performing basic research in Mind-Body medicine and Prediction Science.

Patents/Publications
"Eric has 15 patents in optics, special effects and electronic media, and more than 100 publications in science and technical journals, the web, and Discover Magazine."
  The Listening Cure: Healing Secrets of an Unconventional Doctor Selectbooks, NY. 2017 
 Long Fuse, Big Bang: Achieving Long-Term Success Through Daily Victories. Hyperion, NY, 2010. 
 Brain Safari: 5 Minute Experiments to Explore the Space Between Your Ears Greenleaf, TX, 2018. 
 The Spy in Moscow Station: A Counterspy's Hunt for a Deadly Cold War Threat, Thomas Dunne Books, NY, 2019. 
   Riding the Monster: Five Ways to Innovate Inside Bureaucracies Discovery Democracy Press, California, 2021.

Awards
 National Intelligence Distinguished Service Medal
 Manager of the Year Award, from the Society for Psychologists in Management
 Hughes Patent Award

Notes

External links
 2006 U.S. News & World Report interview of Haseltine when he was working for ODNI
 The New Yorker article from the January 21, 2008 issue which mentions Haseltine while discussing Disney's connection to the NSA and ODNI on page 7
 "Creative Intelligence"—video of Eric Haseltine speaking with Jane Meyer about intelligence matters on May 8, 2008, at the 2008 "Stories from the Near Future" conference put on by The New Yorker magazine (video accessed 06/04/08)

1951 births
Living people
University of California, Berkeley alumni
20th-century American inventors
21st-century American inventors
American aerospace engineers
Analysts of the National Security Agency